Bravo Acrobat! is a 1943 German comedy film directed by Wolfgang Staudte and starring Charlie Rivel, Clara Tabody, and Karl Schönböck. A circus clown rises to stardom. The film was loosely based on the Spanish-born Rivel's own life.

It was shot at the Johannisthal Studios in Berlin and on location around the city. The film's sets were designed by the art director Erich Grave.

Cast

References

External links

Films of Nazi Germany
German comedy films
1943 comedy films
Films directed by Wolfgang Staudte
Tobis Film films
Films shot at Johannisthal Studios
German black-and-white films
1940s German films
1940s German-language films